Chicago Med is an American medical drama that premiered on NBC on November 17, 2015. The series is focused on the emergency department of Gaffney Chicago Medical Center and on its doctors and nurses as they work to save patients' lives. The seventh season premiered on September 22, 2021. The eighth season premiered on September 21, 2022.

Series overview

Episodes

Backdoor pilot (2015)

Season 1 (2015–16)

Season 2 (2016–17)

Season 3 (2017–18)

Season 4 (2018–19)

Season 5 (2019–20)

Season 6 (2020–21)

Season 7 (2021–22)

Season 8 (2022–23)

Home media

References

See also
 List of Chicago Fire episodes
 List of Chicago P.D. episodes
 List of Chicago Justice episodes

External links
 
 

Chicago Med
Episodes